In geometry, the great icosahedron is one of four Kepler–Poinsot polyhedra (nonconvex regular polyhedra), with Schläfli symbol  and Coxeter-Dynkin diagram of . It is composed of 20 intersecting triangular faces, having five triangles meeting at each vertex in a pentagrammic sequence.

The great icosahedron can be constructed analogously to the pentagram, its two-dimensional analogue, via the extension of the -dimensional simplex faces of the core -polytope (equilateral triangles for the great icosahedron, and line segments for the pentagram) until the figure regains regular faces. The grand 600-cell can be seen as its four-dimensional analogue using the same process.

Images

As a snub 
The great icosahedron can be constructed as a uniform snub, with different colored faces and only tetrahedral symmetry: . This construction can be called a retrosnub tetrahedron or retrosnub tetratetrahedron, similar to the snub tetrahedron symmetry of the icosahedron, as a partial faceting of the truncated octahedron (or omnitruncated tetrahedron): .

Related polyhedra 

It shares the same vertex arrangement as the regular convex icosahedron. It also shares the same edge arrangement as the small stellated dodecahedron.

A truncation operation, repeatedly applied to the great icosahedron, produces a sequence of uniform polyhedra. Truncating edges down to points produces the great icosidodecahedron as a rectified great icosahedron. The process completes as a birectification, reducing the original faces down to points, and producing the great stellated dodecahedron.

The truncated great stellated dodecahedron is a degenerate polyhedron, with 20 triangular faces from the truncated vertices, and 12 (hidden) doubled up pentagonal faces ({10/2}) as truncations of the original pentagram faces, the latter forming two great dodecahedra inscribed within and sharing the edges of the icosahedron.

References

 
 (1st Edn University of Toronto (1938))
 H.S.M. Coxeter, Regular Polytopes, (3rd edition, 1973), Dover edition, 3.6 6.2 Stellating the Platonic solids, pp. 96–104

External links 
 
 
 Uniform polyhedra and duals

Kepler–Poinsot polyhedra
Regular polyhedra
Polyhedral stellation
Deltahedra